The company Palfinger AG is an Austrian manufacturer of hydraulic lifting, loading and handling systems, especially known for the cranes. With 150 models and a market share of 35 percent, the company is the world market leader. The PALFINGER Group comprises 84 companies in 32 countries, with 33 manufacturing and assembly sites and approx. 5,000 sales and service locations in more than 130 countries on all continents.

History
The history of Palfinger dates back to 1932, with the founding of a repair shop for agricultural trailers, tippers and vehicle bodies by Richard Palfinger. The company built its first crane in 1959, and Richard's son Hubert specialized in hydraulic loading cranes in 1964. In 1989, Palfinger exported over 90% of its production to about 70 countries. In 1999, the company went public. In the past 20 years, the focus was on diversification as well as internationalization. In June 2018 Andreas Klauser took over as the CEO of PALFINGER.

Shareholders
Around 56,6 % of the Palfinger Group is owned by the Palfinger family, 7,5 % by Sany and around 35,9 % is in diversified holdings. Since June 1999 Palfinger has been listed on the official market of the Vienna Stock Exchange. Since mid-June 2000 the shares of Palfinger AG have also been traded on the OTC market of the Stuttgart, Berlin, Düsseldorf and Frankfurt stock exchanges.

Products
Palfinger produces a number of different types of lifting solutions for specialised and more general applications.

 Loader cranes
 Timber and recycling cranes
 Telescopic and mobile cranes
 Access platforms
 Tail lifts
 Hooklifts 
 Truck-mounted forklifts
 Passenger lifts
 Bridge inspection units 
 Railway systems
 Marine cranes
 Offshore cranes
 Davit systems
 Boats 
 Winches and offshore equipment 
 Wind cranes

PALFINGER considers itself the global market leader for loader cranes, timber and recycling cranes, marine cranes, wind cranes, hooklifts and railway systems. The acquisition of the globally operating Harding Group in 2016 also made PALFINGER the world’s market leader in maritime lifesaving equipment. Moreover, the Company is a leading specialist in tail lifts and truck mounted forklifts.

References 

Manufacturing companies established in 1932
Construction equipment manufacturers of Austria
Crane manufacturers
Austrian brands
Economy of Salzburg (state)
Austrian companies established in 1932